Cheilosia albitarsis is an abundant European species of hoverfly. Adults can be found in spring visiting buttercup flowers and this plant is also the larval hostplant.

Description
A large, broadly-built Cheilosia (wing length 7-9·5 mm.)
Male: thorax dorsum black-haired. Tarsae 1 tarsomere 5 square. Antero-lateral black hairs on tergite 2.
Female:  1 middle tarsomeres pale. Mouth margin not protruding downwards. Arista of hair length equal to diameter of arista. See references for determination
The larva is illustrated by Rotheray (1993).

Distribution
Throughout the Palearctic.

Biology
The habitat is woodland and forest clearings, agricultural land and forest clearings. Also montane and subalpine pasture. Flowers visited include white umbellifers, composites Ajuga, Allium ursinum, Caltha, Crataegus, Matricaria, Potentilla, Prunus spinosa, Ranunculus, Sorbus, Stellaria.The flight period is April to June, and into July at higher altitudes.

References

Diptera of Europe
Taxa named by Johann Wilhelm Meigen
Eristalinae
Insects described in 1822